To be cruel is to cause, be indifferent to or take pleasure from suffering.

Cruel may also refer to:

Songs
 "Cruel" (Alfie Arcuri song), 2016
 "Cruel" (Dane Rumble song), 2009
 "Cruel" (Human Nature song), 1998
 "Cruel" (Snakehips song), 2016
 "Cruel" (Tori Amos song), 1998
 "Cruel" (The Veronicas song), 2015
 "Cruel", by Blancmange from Happy Families, 1982
 "Cruel", by Calexico from Garden Ruin, 2006
 "Cruel", by Dropkick Murphys from Going Out in Style, 2011
 "Cruel", by Foxes from All I Need, 2016
 "Cruel", by Glowie, 2019
 "Cruel", by Hiromi Matsuura, 2005
 "Cruel", by the House of Love from Babe Rainbow, 1992
 "Cruel", by the Human League from Travelogue, 1980
 "Cruel", by Jax Jones from Snacks (Supersize), 2019
 "Cruel", by Jeff Buckley and Gary Lucas from Songs to No One 1991–1992, 2002
 "Cruel", by Kate Rusby, adapted from a traditional song, from Underneath the Stars, 2003
 "Cruel", by Kelly Clarkson from Meaning of Life, 2017
 "Cruel", by Prefab Sprout from Swoon, 1984
 "Cruel", by Public Image Ltd. from That What Is Not, 1992
 "Cruel", by St. Vincent from Strange Mercy, 2011
 "Cruel", by Thomas Dolby from Astronauts & Heretics, 1992
 "Cruel", by Toto from Mindfields, 1999

Other uses
 Cruel (solitaire), a solitaire card game
 Cruel Coppinger, a semi-legendary figure in Cornish folklore
 Katie Cruel, a fictional character from a traditional American folksong
 Mr. Cruel, unidentified 20th-century Australian child murderer and rapist

See also
 Cruella de Vil, Animated series villain
 List of people known as the Cruel